Count Kázmér Antal Ferenc Batthyány de Németújvár (3 June 1807 – 13 July 1854) was a Hungarian politician, who served as Minister of Foreign Affairs during the Hungarian Revolution of 1848. At the beginning he was a conservative aristocrat politician but his views changed after a journey to Western Europe. He gradually became liberal and learnt the Hungarian language. In the House of Magnates of Hungary he supported the reforms of the industry and traffic. He also supported the protection of Hungarian products and the liberation of the serfs.

At the time of the revolution he fought in Délvidék against the rebel Serbs as a volunteer. In 1849 Bertalan Szemere appointed him as Minister of Foreign Affairs. The position's new title shows that Hungary wanted to separate from the Habsburg monarchy. Batthyány also served as acting Minister of Agriculture, Industry and Trade. In August 1849 he emigrated to Turkey along with Lajos Kossuth. From 1851 he lived in Paris.

References
 Magyar Életrajzi Lexikon

1807 births
1854 deaths
Politicians from Bratislava
Foreign ministers of Hungary
Agriculture ministers of Hungary
Kazmer, Batthyany
Lord-lieutenants of a county in Hungarian Kingdom